The Gosen Canal is a canal in the eastern suburbs of Berlin, the capital city of Germany. It takes its name from the village Gosen, at the southern end of the canal. The Dämeritzsee and Seddinsee are both navigable, with the Seddinsee providing a link to the River Dahme and the Oder-Spree Canal, and the Dämeritzsee providing a link to the Müggelspree reach of the River Spree and to the Flakensee. 

Although the plan for the Gosen Canal goes back to 1872, construction did not start until 1933, and the canal opened in 1936. The principal reason for the construction was to provide an alternative route for commercial shipping between Berlin (via the Dämeritzsee) and the Oder-Spree Canal (via the Seddinsee) during the 1936 Summer Olympics, when the more normal route via the Langer See was closed in order to use the regatta course at Grünau for the Olympic canoeing and rowing events. Another explanation is that the canal was built to bring the coal from Königs Wusterhausen to the Klingenberg power station in Berlin-Rummelsburg.

Small craft are also able to navigate between the two lakes using the roughly parallel Gosener Graben. 

Besides seeing considerable sightseeing and leisure traffic, the canal today also forms a link in a commercial navigation route from the limestone workings at Rüdersdorf, which reaches the Flakensee by a lock at Woltersdorf.

References

Bibliography 
 Hans-Joachim Uhlemann: Berlin und die Märkischen Wasserstraßen. transpress Verlag für Verkehrswesen, Berlin div. Jahrgänge.
 Westeuropäischer Schifffahrts- und Hafenkalender. Binnenschifffahrts-Verlag GmbH. Duisburg- Ruhrort div. Jahrgänge.
 Sportschifffahrtskarten Binnen 1  Nautische Veröffentlichung Verlagsgesellschaft, .

Canals in Berlin
Buildings and structures in Treptow-Köpenick
Federal waterways in Germany
Canals opened in 1936